The 2004 Men's Premier Soccer League season was the 2nd season of the MPSL. 

Utah Salt Ratz finished the season as national champions, beating Arizona Sahuaros in the MPSL Championship game

Changes from 2003

New Franchises
Five franchises joined the league this year, all expansion franchises:

Folding
One team left the league prior to the beginning of the season:
Tucson Tiburons - Tucson, Arizona

Final standings
Purple indicates regular season title clinched
Green indicates playoff berth clinched

the first tiebreaker used was head-to-head results, which explains why Arizona finished ahead of Utah despite having an inferior goal difference and scoring less goals.

Playoffs

Semi finals
Utah Salt Ratz 1-0 Chico Rooks
Arizona Sahuaros 4-1 Albuquerque Asylum

Final
Utah Salt Ratz 4-2 Arizona Sahuaros

Bracket

References
 US soccer history archives for 2004

2004
4